Administrative leave is a temporary leave from a job assignment, with pay and benefits intact. Generally, the term is reserved for employees of non-business institutions such as schools, police, and hospitals.

The definition of administrative leave may vary by institution.

Individuals may also be eligible for administrative leave for various reasons including: bereavement, jury/court appearances, military leave, internal reviews, and investigations.

In academic settings, administrative leaves are provided for the same purpose as research/study leaves, i.e., to allow individuals to improve themselves academically and to engage in research to foster their effectiveness as teachers and scholars.

An employee may be placed on administrative leave when an allegation of misconduct is made against an employee, either by a co-worker, student, parent, an alleged victim, or a police officer. During the leave, employers may investigate the situation before determining an appropriate course of action. Administrative leave does not in itself imply that an employee will be disciplined or that an allegation is credible, which is why pay and benefits are not discontinued. It simply allows the employer to investigate the incident, maintaining the employee's status while at the same time removing them from work, eventually leading to either their return or dismissal.

Police officers are routinely placed on administrative leave after a shooting incident while an investigation is conducted, without implying fault on the part of the officer.

Whistleblowers may also be placed on administrative leave as a way to protect them from potential harassment of a supervisor. For example, if they report a case of research misconduct from the Principal Investigation of an academic project.

See also 
 Garden leave

References 

Leave of absence